Sinești may refer to:

Romania
 Sinești, Ialomița
 Sinești, Iași
 Sinești, Vâlcea
 Sinești, a village in the commune Cuca, Argeș County
 Sinești, a district in the town of Potcoava, Olt County
 Sinești (Bahlueț), a tributary of the Bahlueț in Iași County
 Sinești, a tributary of the Valea Boului in Buzău County

Moldova

 Sinești, Ungheni